Ibrahim Yusri (April 20, 1950 – April 20, 2015) was an Egyptian actor. He graduated from the Higher Institute for Dramatic Arts in 1975.

Death 
Yusri died on his 65th birthday on April 20, 2015 in Giza.

Filmography 
 Those Gentlemen (1987)
 The Terrorist (1994)
 Miss Hekmat's Conscience
 The Witness and the Tears

References

External links 

1950 births
2015 deaths
20th-century Egyptian male actors
People from Giza
Egyptian male film actors